Lisa Jacobs is a British actress who is best known for playing Jewish diarist Anne Frank in the 1988 television film, The Attic: The Hiding of Anne Frank. She was nominated for the Primetime Emmy Award for Outstanding Supporting Actress in a Miniseries or a Movie for her role in this movie. The film also starred Mary Steenburgen as Miep Gies.

Jacobs has appeared in a number of other films, television films, and television series. She provided her voice in the UK versions of the video games Laura's Happy Adventures and Alex Builds His Farm. She also acts in stage.

She met actor Steven Mackintosh while they were appearing on stage together, and they married in 1989. They live in North London with their two daughters, Martha Mackintosh and Blythe Mackintosh.

References

External links

Living people
British television actresses
British stage actresses
British film actresses
Year of birth missing (living people)
Place of birth missing (living people)